Zdzisław Jan Ewangelii Antoni Krygowski (Lwów, 1872 — 1955, Poznań) was a Polish mathematician, rector of the Lwów Polytechnic (1917–18), and professor at Poznań University (1919–38, 1946–55).

Enigma
Krygowski has become famous in the history of cryptology for having assisted the Polish General Staff in setting up its cryptology course for Poznań University mathematics students that began on January 15, 1929.  This led eventually to the General Staff's Cipher Bureau's recruitment of Marian Rejewski, Henryk Zygalski and Jerzy Różycki, who would jointly break and decrypt the World War II-era German Enigma-machine ciphers, beginning at the end of December 1932.

Family
Zdzisław Krygowski had three brothers - Tadeusz, Kazimierz and Stanisław.
He married Rose New from England. They had one daughter Eileen Krygowska-Korczyńska, who after World War II worked for Jan Nowak-Jeziorański at RFE.

See also
List of Poles

Notes

References
Stanisław Jakóbczyk and Janusz Stokłosa, eds., Złamanie szyfru Enigma.  Poznański pomnik polskich kryptologów (The Breaking of the Enigma Cipher:  the Poznań Monument to the Polish Cryptologists), Poznań, Wydawnictwo Poznańskiego Towarzystwa Przyjaciół Nauk, 2007, .

1872 births
1955 deaths
19th-century Polish mathematicians
20th-century Polish mathematicians
Lviv Polytechnic rectors